The 2017 Columbus Challenger was a professional tennis tournament played on indoor hard courts. It was the fourth edition of the tournament which was part of the 2017 ATP Challenger Tour. It took place in Columbus, United States between 18 and 24 September 2017.

Singles main draw entrants

Seeds

 1 Rankings are as of September 11, 2017.

Other entrants
The following players received entry into the singles main draw as wildcards:
  Martin Joyce
  John McNally
  Kyle Seelig
  J. J. Wolf

The following players received entry into the singles main draw using protected rankings:
  Frank Dancevic
  Kevin King
  Alexander Ward

The following player received entry into the singles main draw as an alternate:
  Ante Pavić

The following players received entry from the qualifying draw:
  Luke Bambridge
  Matthew Barton
  Jared Hiltzik
  Aleksandar Vukic

Champions

Singles

 Ante Pavić def.  Alexander Ward 6–7(11–13), 6–4, 6–3.

Doubles

 Dominik Köpfer /  Denis Kudla def.  Luke Bambridge /  David O'Hare 7–6(8–6), 7–6(7–3).

External links
 Official website

Columbus Challenger